In stochastic calculus, stochastic logarithm of a semimartingale such that  and  is the semimartingale  given byIn layperson's terms, stochastic logarithm of   measures the cumulative percentage change in .

Notation and terminology 
The process  obtained above is commonly denoted .

General formula and special cases 

 If  is continuous, then In particular, if  is a geometric Brownian motion, then  is a Brownian motion with a constant drift rate.
 If  is continuous and of finite variation, thenHere  need not be differentiable with respect to time; for example,  can equal 1 plus the Cantor function.

Properties 

 Stochastic logarithm is an inverse operation to stochastic exponential: If , then .
For this reason one must write  and not .
 Stochastic logarithm of a local martingale that does not vanish together with its left limit  is again a local martingale.
 All the formulae and properties above apply also to stochastic logarithm of a complex-valued .
 Stochastic logarithm can be defined also for processes  that are absorbed in zero after jumping to zero. Such definition is meaningful up to the first time that   reaches  continuously.

Useful identities 

 Converse of the Yor formula: If  do not vanish together with their left limits, then
 Stochastic logarithm of : If , then

Applications 

 Girsanov's theorem can be paraphrased as follows: Let  be a probability measure equivalent to another probability measure . For a semimartingale  the following are equivalent:
 Process  is special under .
 Process  is special under . 

References 

== See also ==

 Stochastic exponential

Stochastic calculus